Cotham may refer to:

 Cotham, Bristol, the name of both a council ward of the city of Bristol, England, and a suburb of the city that falls within that ward
 Cotham Marble, named after Cotham House in Cotham, Bristol
 Cotham, Nottinghamshire, a small village on the east bank of the River Devon, near Newark-on-Trent, England
 Caleb Cotham, American baseball player and coach

See also
 Coatham, a district of Redcar, North Yorkshire
 Coatham Mundeville, a village near Darlington, County Durham
 Cottam (disambiguation)